Cupid's Rustler is a 1924 American silent Western film directed by Francis Ford and starring Edmund Cobb and Florence Gilbert. It also featured an early appearance by the future star Janet Gaynor.

Cast
 Edmund Cobb as Victim of a Crooked Card Game 
 Florence Gilbert as Another Victim of Circumstances 
 Clark B. Coffey as The Sheriff 
 Ashton Dearholt as Harry 
 Wilbur McGaugh as Foreman 
 Janet Gaynor

References

External links
 

1924 films
1924 Western (genre) films
Films directed by Francis Ford
American black-and-white films
Arrow Film Corporation films
Silent American Western (genre) films
1920s English-language films
1920s American films